Makotuku is a locality in the Manawatu-Whanganui Region of New Zealand's North Island, about  west of Ormondville.

The settlement formed around the temporary railway terminus and was often called Makotoko. Makotuku probably refers to the place of the heron, or kōtuku.

Makotuku is in  meshblock 1534900, which had a population of 54 in 2018.

Makotuku School opened in 1881. By 1885 it had about 100 pupils. It merged into Norsewood School in 2003.

In 1881 the Beaconsfield Hotel was moved from Kopua to a site next to the station. In 1888 it was replaced by a new hotel and the old one replaced the village hall. The new hotel burnt down in 1912. Makotuku Hotel was built in 1887. It was burnt down in 1933 and its owner was imprisoned for insurance fraud. 

In 1886 bush fires caused a relief fund to be set up for those who had lost their homes.

An Anglican Church was built in 1890 and rebuilt after an 1898 fire. St Martins was moved to Linton Camp in 1974.

Makotuku railway station 
Makotuku railway station was on the Palmerston North–Gisborne Line. Slow progress with the line from Napier and Spit was criticised, after the  extension of line opened from Kopua (the previous temporary terminus) via Ormondville on 9 August 1880. In 1884 Makotuku had two trains a day, one of which continued south to Matamau. Various sawmillers used the railway, including Grey & Powers, Mr Gundrie, Mr Tower, Mathew & Co and F Sidney.

Initially the station would have been very spartan, as it wasn't until 25 August 1880 that authority was sought for furnishing the station and until 28 October to move Kopua goods shed to Makotuku and install a water supply. In 1881 a 5th class stationmaster's house, coal shed, and privy were added. From 1882 to 1918 there was a Post Office at the station. By 1884 there was an engine shed, but later that year there was a complaint when the goods shed was removed from Makotuku. Stockyards were added in 1893 and by 1896 there was a 5th class station with luggage room, platform, cart approach, cattle yards, stationmaster's house, urinals, passing loop for 35 wagons, extended to 80 wagons in 1940. In 1898 sheep yards were added. In 1891 express trains started crossing at Makotuku. In 1904 the passing loop could take 34 wagons, extended in 1940 for 80 wagons. Railway housing was mentioned in reports in 1896 and 1937. A verandah was added to the station building in 1911 and the platform was asphalted.

In 1965 it was noted there was one light on the platform and one over the stockyards. In 1968 the crossing loop was lifted. Passenger services ended on 31 May 1976 and goods on Sunday, 20 July 1980. By 1988 a small station building remained, but the platform had recently been  demolished. In 2015 the loading bank remained and a single track runs through the station site.

Smith's Siding 
In 1888 goods for the residents were going there. A new sawmill was built in 1891. Gamman sawmills took over at Smith's Siding in 1893 and one of the family died there in 1901. A loop for 15 wagons was mentioned in 1896 and one for 20 wagons in 1898. H B Timber Co had a mill near the siding in 1896. The siding was still in use in 1906.

In the 1990s a passing loop of over a kilometre was laid on the site of the siding.

Makotuku Viaduct 

Makotuku Viaduct is east of the station, between Makotuku and Ormondville.

The original timber (probably totara) truss viaduct was built between 1878 and 1880 by Proudfoot and M'Kay's manager, A Graham. The contract for this and the two bridges to the north was for £16,758, or £15,195 1s 8d.

J & A Anderson & Co of Christchurch won a tender for a wrought iron replacement. It was rebuilt in 1898,  higher than the original bridge. In the same era Andersons also rebuilt Kopua (1895), Piripiri (1899), Matamau (1899), Mangatera (1900), Ormondville (1906) and Makatote (1908) viaducts.

References

External links
Photo of Makotuku Hotel
Pre 1912 photo of station (page 107)
Photo of war memorial unveiling 1920
Photo of trains at Makotuku in 1956
2012 photo of viaduct

Tararua District
Populated places in Manawatū-Whanganui

Railway stations opened in 1880
Railway stations closed in 1980
Rail transport in Manawatū-Whanganui
Defunct railway stations in New Zealand
Viaducts in New Zealand
Railway bridges in New Zealand
Bridges in Manawatū-Whanganui